UCLA Blue is the dark azure color used in association with the University of California, Los Angeles (UCLA). It is described as a deep sky blue and is accompanied by a sun gold, UCLA Gold. Both are colloquially referred to as "blue and gold."

UCLA Blue was approved by the Chancellor of UCLA in March 2004 for use by the school's academic and administrative units. While this was distinct from True Blue adopted by UCLA Athletics in the early 2000s, the athletic department aligned to use UCLA Blue in 2021 when Nike and the Jordan Brand took over apparel rights for the Bruin varsity sports teams.

The hexadecimal value of the color is 2774AE. UCLA Blue is a Pantone color.

See also 
List of colors

References

External links 
UCLA Brand Guidelines

School colors
Shades of blue
Blue
2004 introductions